Connecting Slough, the former slough between Kern Lake and Buena Vista Lake in the southeastern San Joaquin Valley, in Kern County, California.

It was part of the Tulare Lake Basin and Kern River system, before agricultural diversions by the Central Valley Project. It was a tributary of the San Joaquin River until the latter 19th century.

References

Former rivers
Kern River
Rivers of Kern County, California
Tulare Basin watershed
Geography of the San Joaquin Valley
Rivers of Southern California